Firozpur district, also known as Ferozepur district, is one of the twenty-three districts in the state of Punjab, India.

Firozpur (Ferozepur) is the capital city of the district. It is situated inside ten gates—Amritsari Gate, Wansi Gate, Makhu Gate, Zira Gate, Bagdadi Gate, Mori Gate, Delhi Gate, Magjani Gate, Multani Gate, and Kasuri Gate.

Demographics
According to the 2011 Census the undivided Firozpur district had a population of 2,029,074. This gives it a ranking of 230th in India (out of a total of 640). Its population growth rate over the decade 2001–2011 was 16.08%. Firozpur has a sex ratio of 893 females for every 1000 males, and a literacy rate of 69.8%. (This data is before the creation of Fazilka district).

After bifurcation of Fazilika district, the residual district has a population of 1,001,931. Scheduled Castes made up 42.85% of the population.

Religion

Language 

At the time of the 2011 census, 93.01% of the population spoke Punjabi and 5.67% Rajasthani as their first language.

Politics

Administration
The district is administratively into the following tehsils:

 Firozpur
 Zira
 Guru Har Sahai

List of Sub-Tehsils of Firozpur
 Makhu
 Talwandi Bhai
 Mamdot
Mudki

Blocks of district Firozpur
 Firozpur
 Ghall Khurd
 Guru Har Sahai
 Makhu
 Mamdot
 Zira

Vidhan Sabha Seats in Firozpur
 Firozpur
 Firozpur Rural
 Guru Har Sahai
 Zira

Notes

References

External links

 

 
Districts of Punjab, India